Günther Maleuda (20 January 1931 – 18 July 2012) was an East German politician. From November 1989 to April 1990 he was the President of the People's Chamber (East German Parliament).

Early years
He was born in Alt Beelitz, (today Stare Bielice, Poland). In 1950 he joined the Democratic Farmers' Party of Germany (Demokratische Bauernpartei Deutschlands). From 1952 to 1955 he studied Economics.

Career
From 1958 to 1967 Maleuda was a member of the district council of Königs Wusterhausen, from 1967 to 1976 a member of the district council of Potsdam and from 1976 to 1982 he was a member of the district council of Halle. In 1981 he was elected as a member of the People's Chamber.

From 1977 to 1990 he was a member of the Presidium of the Democratic Farmers' Party of Germany (DBD).
On 27 March 1987 Maleuda became chairman of the DBD and at the same time a deputy chairman of the Council of State.

On 13 November 1989 he was the successor of Horst Sindermann as President of the People's Chamber (until March 1990). Maleuda supported the reforms and took part in the round table negotiations.

Although his party merged with the CDU in October 1990, Maleuda refused to be a member of the Christian Democratic Union.

In 1994 he was elected as a (non-party) member of the Bundestag (German Parliament) on the PDS list. He remained a member until 1998.

References

1931 births
2012 deaths
People from Strzelce-Drezdenko County
People from the Province of Brandenburg
Democratic Farmers' Party of Germany politicians
Party of Democratic Socialism (Germany) politicians
Members of the State Council of East Germany
Presidents of the Volkskammer
Members of the 8th Volkskammer
Members of the 9th Volkskammer
Members of the 10th Volkskammer
Members of the Bundestag for Mecklenburg-Western Pomerania
Members of the Bundestag 1994–1998
Recipients of the Patriotic Order of Merit in gold
Members of the Bundestag for the Party of Democratic Socialism (Germany)